The 2019 Soul Train Music Awards took place on November 17 at the Orleans Arena in Las Vegas, Nevada, and aired live for the first time, on BET and BET Her. It was hosted by Tisha Campbell & Tichina Arnold, honoring artists in 12 different categories. During the ceremony Jimmy Jam and Terry Lewis were honored with the Legend Award, while gospel singer Yolanda Adams received the Lady of Soul Award for her contributions to the music industry.

Special Awards
Honorees are as listed below:

Legend Award
Jimmy Jam & Terry Lewis

Lady Of Soul Award
Yolanda Adams

Nominees
Nominees are as listed below. Winners are in bold:

Best New Artist
Summer Walker
Lucky Daye
Mahalia
Nicole Bus
Pink Sweat$
YK Osiris

Soul Train Certified Award
Trevor Jackson
Ciara
Daniel Caesar
Fantasia
India Arie
Kelly Rowland

Best R&B/Soul Female Artist
H.E.R.
Ari Lennox
Beyoncé
Lizzo
Mary J. Blige
Summer Walker

Best R&B/Soul Male Artist
Khalid

Bruno Mars
Chris Brown
Daniel Caesar
Tank

Best Gospel/Inspirational Award
Kirk Franklin
BeBe Winans
Donald Lawrence
Erica Campbell
Tasha Cobbs Leonard
Tori Kelly

Rhythm & Bars Award (Best Hip-Hop Song Of The Year)
Cardi B – "Money"
21 Savage – "A Lot" 
DaBaby – "Suge"
J. Cole – "Middle Child" 
Meek Mill – "Going Bad" 
Megan Thee Stallion – "Cash Shit"

Song Of The Year
Chris Brown – "No Guidance" 
Beyoncé – "Before I Let Go"
Ella Mai – "Shot Clock"
Khalid – "Talk"
Lizzo – "Juice"
Summer Walker – "Girls Need Love" (Remix)

Album/Mixtape Of The Year
Lizzo – Cuz I Love You
Ari Lennox – Shea Butter Baby
Chris Brown – Indigo
Ella Mai – Ella Mai
H.E.R. – I Used to Know Her
Khalid – Free Spirit

The Ashford And Simpson Songwriter's Award
Beyoncé, Saint Jhn, & Wizkid – "Brown Skin Girl"  
Written by Beyoncé, Carlos St. John, Adio Marchant, Shawn Carter, Stacy Barthe, Anathi Mnyango, Michael Uzowuru, Wizkid & Richard Isong
H.E.R. – "Hard Place"
Written by H.E.R., David Harris, Sam Ashworth, James Fauntleroy & Ruby Amanfu
Lizzo – "Juice"
Written by Melissa Jefferson, Theron Thomas, Eric Frederic, Sam Sumser and Sean Small   
 – "Make It Better" 
Written by Brandon Anderson, William Robinson, Alana Chenervert, Miguel Atwood-Ferguson, Daniel Maman & Farid Nassar
Chris Brown – "No Guidance" 
Written by Christopher Brown, Aubrey Graham, Anderson Hernandez, Joshua Louis Huizar, Teddy Walton, Noah Shebib, Nija Charles, Tyler Bryant & Michee Lebrun
Khalid – "Talk"
Written by Khalid Robinson, Guy Lawrence, & Howard Lawrence

Best Dance Performance
Chris Brown – "No Guidance" 
Beyoncé – "Spirit"
Lizzo – "Juice"
Normani – "Motivation"
Teyana Taylor – "WTP"
DaniLeigh – "Easy" (Remix)

Best Collaboration Performance
Chris Brown – "No Guidance" 
Ari Lennox & J. Cole – "Shea Butter Baby" 
Beyoncé, Saint Jhn & Wizkid – "Brown Skin Girl" 
Cardi B & Bruno Mars – "Please Me" 
PJ Morton – "Say So" 
Ty Dolla $ign – "Purple Emoji"

Video Of The Year
Lizzo – "Juice"
Alicia Keys – "Raise a Man"
Beyoncé – "Spirit"
Childish Gambino – "Feels Like Summer"
Chris Brown – "No Guidance" 
Khalid – "Better"

Multiple nominations and awards

The following received multiple nominations:

The following received multiple awards:

References 

Soul
Soul Train Music Awards
Soul
Soul
Soul Train Music Awards 2018